The Talamasca, sometimes known as the Order of the Talamasca, is a fictional secret society described in the works of Anne Rice. It features in both The Vampire Chronicles and Lives of the Mayfair Witches series.

It is described as a secret society set up to research, watch over and keep track of the paranormal, in particular, witches, spirits, werewolves and vampires.  Rice describes them as "psychic detectives".  Many vampiric characters from Rice's novels once belonged to the Talamasca before accepting the "dark gift".  Jesse Reeves, David and Merrick Mayfair, are the most popular of Rice's ex-Talamasca characters.

The Talamasca represents one strand of Rice's theme of anthropology in her work which she repeatedly returns to.  There are a number of anthropologists in, or connected with the Talamasca.  The Talamasca can itself be seen as a kind of parallel to physical anthropology, looking for artifiacts of another world.  This is especially clear in the Talamasca's secret search for the Taltos.  The Talamasca provides a solid foundation for Rice's work.  With a history going back centuries it is like a backbone going through Rice's work which makes it coherent within itself.

History in Rice's works
Introduced in The Queen of the Damned, the Talamasca is said to have formed in 758 by Teskhamen, Heskreth and Gremt, and though it operates in offices worldwide, the organization's central files are held in London.

In the novel Prince Lestat it is revealed to the vampire Pandora and Arjun that the founder of the Talamasca is the spirit Pandora had encountered upon the death of Cassiodorus. The leader at that time is David Talbot, who spearheaded its growth at the end of the twentieth century. Earlier in the Vampire Chronicles, the society was sent to New Orleans to uncover the truth behind the story told in Interview with the Vampire.

Their motto is: "We watch. And we are always there." (Queen of the Damned, Witching Hour, and The Vampire Companion)

References

The Vampire Chronicles
Fictional organizations
Fictional secret societies